The Spear-O-Wigwam Ranch is a former dude ranch, now a campus of Sheridan College, Wyoming, the Spear-O-Wigwam Mountain Campus. It was listed on the National Register of Historic Places in 2016.

It closed as a dude ranch in 2011.

One of its log guest cabins is known as the "Hemingway Cabin", where Ernest Hemingway stayed in 1928 with his wife Pauline while writing A Farewell to Arms.

See also
4 Lazy F Dude Ranch, also NRHP-listed in Grand Teton National Park, Wyoming

References

Historic districts on the National Register of Historic Places in Wyoming
Johnson County, Wyoming
Dude ranches in Wyoming
Sheridan College